Official Journal may refer to the public journal of several nations and other political organizations:

 Belgian Official Journal
 Journal Officiel de la République Française
 Official Journal of the European Patent Office
 Official Journal of the European Union

See also
 Diario Oficial (disambiguation)